The towns and cities of Downstate New York were created by the U.S. state of New York as municipalities in order to give residents more direct say over local government. Present-day Westchester, Bronx, New York, Richmond, Kings, Queens, Nassau, and Suffolk counties were part of York Shire from 1664-August 1673 and again from February 1674 until 1683 at which point the Province of New York was divided into counties. From August 1673 to February 1674 New York was under Dutch control and English political units were suspended, then restored under English rule. York Shire was divided into three divisions called ridings, the East, West, and North ridings. In 1683 the colony of New York eliminated shires and ridings in favor of counties, the East Riding becoming Suffolk County, West Riding the counties of Richmond and Kings, while the North Riding became the counties of Westchester (including present-day Bronx), New York, and Queens (including present-day Nassau).

New York experimented with different types of municipalities before settling upon the current format of towns and cities occupying all the land in a county, and all previous forms were transformed into towns (or divided into multiple towns) in 1788 when all of the state of New York was divided into towns. Some early forms of government in earlier years included land patents with some municipal rights, districts, precincts, and boroughs. Though originally intended to be mere “…involuntary subdivisions of the state, constituted for the purpose of the more convenient exercise of governmental functions by the state for the benefit of all its citizens” as defined by the courts in 1916 (Short v. Town of Orange), towns gained home rule powers from the state in 1964, at which time towns became "a municipal corporation comprising the inhabitants within its boundaries, and formed with the purpose of exercising such powers and discharging such duties of local government and administration of public affairs as have been, or, maybe [sic] conferred or imposed upon it by law.”

The following time-line shows the creation of the current towns from their predecessors stretching back to the earliest municipal entity over the area. It represents from which old town (s) a particular new town was created, but does not represent annexations of territory to and from towns that already existed. All municipalities are towns unless otherwise noted as patent, township, borough, district, or city.

Westchester and Bronx counties

Notes

New York County

Notes

Richmond County

Notes

Kings County

Notes

All towns and cities in Kings County were annexed to the City of Brooklyn starting in 1854 with Bushwick and Williamsburgh and ending with the last remaining town- Flatlands in 1896. At that point the city of Brooklyn and Kings County were coterminous. In 1898 the city and county would be annexed to the city of New York as the borough of Brooklyn and remain Kings County.

Queens and Nassau counties

Notes

Oyster Bay was English territory from 1650, whereas the other towns received patents from the Dutch.

Suffolk County

Notes

Brookhaven- from 1661-1664 Connecticut Colony.
East Hampton- from 1657-1664 Connecticut Colony.
Huntington- from 1660-1664 Connecticut Colony.
Southampton- from 1644-1664 Connecticut Colony; 1664-1673 Province of New York; 1673-1674 Connecticut Colony.
Southold- from 1640-1662 under the New Haven Colony; 1662-1664 Connecticut Colony.

See also
Administrative divisions of New York
Timeline of town creation in New York's Capital District
Timeline of town creation in the Hudson Valley
Timeline of town creation in Central New York
List of former municipalities in New York City
List of municipalities on Long Island

References

Former municipalities in New York (state)
 
 
Former municipalities
Long Island
Westchester County, New York
History of New York (state)
Former towns in New York City
Former villages in New York City